Seabound is the fourteenth season of the computer-animated Ninjago television series (titled Ninjago: Masters of Spinjitzu before the eleventh season). The series was created by Michael Hegner and Tommy Andreasen. The season aired in April 2021, following The Island, which aired in March of the same year. It is followed by the fifteenth season, Crystalized.

The season focuses on the main ninja character Nya. It follows the storyline of her elemental powers being disrupted and how this is connected to an ancient mythical creature. The plot involves the ninja characters Jay, Zane, PIXAL, and Lloyd journeying deep beneath the sea to explore the mystery behind Nya's elemental powers . The season introduces two antagonists named Miss Demeanor and Prince Kalmaar, with the latter being the season's main antagonist. It is dedicated to Kirby Morrow, the voice actor for the character Cole, who passed away prior to the season's premiere.

Voice cast

Main 
 Sam Vincent as Lloyd Garmadon, the Green Ninja
 Vincent Tong as Kai, the red ninja and Elemental Master of Fire
 Michael Adamthwaite as Jay, the blue ninja and Elemental Master of Lightning
 Brent Miller as Zane, the white ninja and Elemental Master of Ice
 Kirby Morrow as Cole, the black ninja and Elemental Master of Earth
 Kelly Metzger as Nya, the Elemental Master of Water and Kai's sister
 Paul Dobson as Sensei Wu, the wise teacher of the ninja
 Jennifer Hayward as P.I.X.A.L. a female nindroid
 Jillian Michaels as Maya, Kai and Nya's mother
 Giles Panton as Kalmaar, the prince and later king of Merlopia
 Cole Howard as Benthomaar

Supporting 
 Erin Mathews as Miss Demeanor
 Ron Halder as King Trimaar, the former king of Merlopia who is murdered by Kalmaar.
 Kathleen Barr as Misako
 Vincent Tong as Ray
 Paul Dobson as Chief Mammatus and Cecil Putnam
 Michael Adamthwaite as Smythe
 Brian Drummond as Shippleton and Hailmar
 Kirby Morrow as Underhill
 Brynna Drummond as Antonia
 David Raynolds as Nelson
 Tabitha St Germain as Sammy
 Sabrina Pitre as Vania
 Michael Donovan as Police Commissioner
 Kelly Sheridan as Gayle Gossip
 Alan Marriott as Dareth
 Cathy Weseluck as Patty Keys
 Brian Drummond as Gripe
 Sam Vincent as Glutinous
 Jillian Michaels as Sphinx

Casting 
Seabound is the last season to feature Kirby Morrow as the voice actor for the main character Cole, which he had voiced for a decade since the beginning of the series. On 25 November 2020, The Lego Group confirmed in a statement on Twitter that the actor had completed his recordings for the season and that it would be dedicated to his memory. The statement also said, "We mourn the tragic loss of Ninjago actor Kirby Morrow who voiced Cole for more than ten years. His dedicated portrayal brought a unique sensibility to the character and gave hours of joy to the countless fans who have enjoyed Ninjago since 2011."

The voice actor for the main antagonist of the season, Kalmaar, was revealed to be Giles Panton by co-creator Tommy Andreasen on Twitter on 7 April 2021.

Release 
Anticipation for the season grew in early 2021, prior to its release. This was fuelled by several story hints dropped in the preceding months by co-creator Tommy Andreasen on Twitter, which included the comment that, "one ninja will change dramatically in stories to come". An official poster for the season was released in March 2021 on Lego Life, which depicted the six main ninja characters in mid-dive with Nya in the centre, emphasising her role as the focal character of the season. On 16 May 2021, lead writer Bragi Schut confirmed on Twitter that Seabound is the fourteenth season of the series but on 10 June of the same year, he clarified that he considers the fourteenth season to be both The Island and  Seabound. However, co-creator Tommy Andreasen previously stated on 18 May 2021 that he considers The Island and  Seabound to be two different installments.

Plot 
While trying to stop a criminal named Miss Demeanor from smuggling vengestone, Nya begins to lose control of her powers. Master Wu tells the ninja that the First Spinjitzu Master once controlled the elements but never wind and water because they belonged to Wojira, a storm and sea spirit and god. Wojira fell into a deep slumber after a warrior pried both of the amulets off the serpent's forehead. Ray and Maya arrive to help Nya control her powers. While P.I.X.A.L. and Zane are out on a mission, they experience an energy pulse from deep in the ocean and conclude that it affected Nya's powers. The ninja decide to investigate on the Hydro Bounty, a submersible vessel.

Nya, Jay, Lloyd, Zane, and P.I.X.A.L. journey to the depths of the ocean with Maya stowed away on board. Unfortunately, the Hydro Bounty crashes causing them to be stranded. Maya and Nya decide to use mechs to reach the energy source and discover an underwater temple. They find Kalmaar, the son of King Trimaar, trying to awaken the serpent Wojira. He takes them prisoner and overhears Nya revealing the location of the Storm Amulet. Meanwhile, Jay decides to risk charging the battery in the Hydro Bounty using his elemental powers. Nya and Maya are rescued by Jay and Lloyd but they are captured and taken to King Trimaar who accuses them of trespassing. Kalmaar performs a palace coup by striking his father with his weapon and declaring himself king of the Merlopians. His adopted brother Benthomaar learns the truth from Trimaar. Benthomaar helps the ninja to escape Merlopia. They decide to travel to the island to obtain the Storm Amulet before Kalmaar can claim it. The tragic tale of Benthomaar is revealed, a tale filled with treachery and betrayal, but also a glimmer of hope.

On the Island of the Keepers, the ninja warn Chief Mammatus to prepare to defend the Storm Amulet. However, Zane realises it is a fake and that the real amulet was taken by Clutch Powers to the Explorers Club. Wu, Cole, Misako, Kai and Ray arrive at the Explorers Club and are forced to battle Kalmaar. Meanwhile, Nya uses her powers to call whales to bring the stranded Hydro Bounty back to Ninjago City. As Kai is pursuing Kalmaar through the streets of Ninjago City, Antonia and Nelson obtain the amulet and are chased by Kalmaar, but he escapes with the amulet. Benthomaar tells the ninja the tale of Nyad, the first Elemental Master of Water, who defeated Wojira by becoming one with the ocean. When Kalmaar tries to leave the city, Nya steals the amulet and Cole takes it to Shintaro for protection without realising it is fake, allowing Kalmaar to reawaken Wojira.

Rising sea levels mark the invasion of Ninjago City by Kalmaar riding on Wojira, which forces the citizens to evacuate. While the ninja are trying to save civilians, Nya challenges Kalmaar and Wojira. Jay becomes trapped in his submersible vehicle and is saved by Benthomaar, but inhales water in his lungs. To save Jay and Ninjago City, Nya becomes one with the ocean, an act that can never be undone, causing the water to be removed from Jay's lungs. A battle takes place between the ninja and Kalmaar in which Benthomaar breaks Kalmaar's trident causing him to lose control of Wojira. This results in Kalmaar being swallowed whole by Wojira. Nya transforms into a water dragon and defeats Wojira by destroying the Wave Amulet. Having merged with the endless sea, however, Nya can no longer remain on land and feels the ocean calling to her.  After a tearful goodbye, she leaves the Ninja and returns to the ocean. Afterwards, the ninja hold a memorial ceremony to honor her and Nya is seen happily swimming with the whales in a final shot.

Episodes

Accolades 
In 2022, Seabound received 4 nominations in the Animation Series category of the Leo Awards for Best Program (jointly with The Island), Best Direction for the "Turn of the Tide", Best Art Direction for "Nyad" and Best Sound for "Assault on Ninjago City".

See also 
 Lloyd Garmadon
 Lego Ninjago

References

Primary

Secondary 

Seabound
2021 Canadian television seasons
2021 Danish television seasons